Harrisburg is an unincorporated community in Gallia County, in the U.S. state of Ohio.

History
Harrisburg was platted in 1837. A variant name was Harris. A post office called Harris was established in 1857, and remained in operation until 1905.

References

Unincorporated communities in Gallia County, Ohio
1837 establishments in Ohio
Populated places established in 1837
Unincorporated communities in Ohio